Éric Borel (11 December 1978 – 24 September 1995) was a French high school student and spree killer who, at the age of 16, murdered his family in Solliès-Pont in the arrondissement of Toulon on 23 September 1995, and afterwards shot dead twelve other people and injured four more in the village of Cuers the next day. When police arrived at the scene, Borel shot himself.

Biography

Childhood 
Éric Borel was the son of Marie-Jeanne Parenti and Jacques Borel, who were both working in the military at the time of his birth. However, their liaison was rather short, and after they separated, Borel was sent to Jacques' parents in Limoges, where he stayed until he was five. When his mother, who had visited Borel only occasionally up to that time, began to live with Yves Bichet, she again took care of her son and brought him to their home in Solliès-Pont.

Borel's mother was an authoritarian and – at least outwardly – a devoutly religious member of the Secours catholique. She mistreated and beat her son, who she believed to be a "child of sin". Borel never developed a close relationship with his mother's new companion, with whom he was said to have frequent rows and who reportedly also beat him on occasions. However, Franck and Jean-Luc Bichet, Yves Bichet's sons, stated that their father had always been nice to Borel, even building him a shack for his chickens and other animals he took home.

When Borel broke his arm at the age of eight, he preferred to run away and hide rather than go home; he was eventually found shivering from pain. In this type of situation, Borel, who was known as a quiet and taciturn boy who kept to himself, grew up and developed an increasing admiration for the military. He told lies about the heroic deeds of his father during the Indochina War and adored his stepbrother Franck Bichet, who served in the army. He had an affection for weapons and used to shoot sparrows with an air gun.

Later years and motive 
Until his death, Borel attended the lycée professionnel Georges-Cisson in Toulon, where he studied electromechanics and did well academically. He was said to be a disciplined and quiet student. However, in his last year at school, there was a radical change in Borel's behavior. He skipped classes without explanation and became unaffable. He also regularly said that he could not bear it anymore at home, that he had had enough of doing housework and being called names, and often stated his wish to join the military like his father and grandfather. Apparently, the week prior to the shooting, Borel also told one of his classmates that he would kill himself, but not before killing two or three people. Borel's only known friend at school was 17-year-old Alan Guillemette, an outgoing and popular classmate.

Many reports erroneously stated that Borel's room was full of Nazi paraphernalia, and rumors he was fascist sympathizer were spurred even more by the fact that his stepfather had attended several meetings of the Front National in 1989. But besides a picture of Adolf Hitler cut out from a newspaper, graffiti displaying a swastika on his door, a few books on World War II, as well as a documentary about the Waco siege, no evidence was found after his death that he was interested in any kind of politics. A girl from Cuers spread a story that Borel had told her about his relationship with his half-sister Caroline, who was supposed to be his pregnant girlfriend. However, the sister in question did not exist, nor was it true that his father had died of cancer shortly before his rampage.

Attacks

Familicide 
The series of attacks started on 23 September 1995, at about 6:00 p.m. CET, when Borel killed his stepfather, Yves Bichet, in the kitchen by shooting him four times with an Anschütz .22-caliber rifle, before smashing his head with a hammer. Police assumed that they had a quarrel beforehand, when Borel tried to run away from home. Next, Borel assaulted his half-brother, 11-year-old Jean-Yves Bichet, who was watching television, in a similar manner. After wiping up the blood trails, Borel waited for his mother to come home.

As soon as Borel's mother, Marie-Jeanne Parenti, arrived at home from church at about 8:30 p.m., he immediately killed her with a single shot to the head. In contrast to her husband and stepson, no blunt force was used on Parenti, although some reports have suggested that he beat her as well with either the hammer or a baseball bat. When his mother lay dead, Borel once again started to clean the house from blood, covered the bodies with sheets and closed all shutters, as well as the steel gate. Carrying a bag packed with food, money, a raincoat, a map of Limoges, and a pistol shooting rubber bullets, and armed with the rifle and pockets full of ammunition, Borel made his way towards Cuers. He initially travelled by car, but eventually he crashed it into a wall; he continued his path by foot. He presumably spent the night between vines.

The bodies of the Borel's murdered family were found at approximately 1 a.m. by Yves Bichet's son Jean-Luc, a student living in Antibes who only occasionally visited his father on weekends. After calling police, Jean-Luc was first considered a suspect in the murders when giving contradictory information. The absence of Borel remained undetected until about three hours later.

Shooting spree 
On the day following the familicide, at 7:15 a.m., Borel arrived at the home of his friend Alan Guillemette. When Guillemette's mother opened the door, Borel asked her to wake him. The two had a lengthy discussion in the garden. Borel apparently wanted something from Guillemette, but when he declined and turned to go back into the house, Borel shot him in the back and mortally wounded him. From 7:30 a.m. onwards, Borel started shooting people at random. No one grew suspicious of his rifle until he started his rampage, since it was hunting season and the sight of rifles outside was to be expected.

First Borel shot at Ginette Vialette through an open window, mortally wounding her, as well as Denise Otto, whom he killed as she was bringing the trash out. He also hit Otto's husband, Jean, in the shoulder. Subsequently, Borel injured an elderly woman who was walking in the streets with her husband, and shot and wounded two brothers who were crossing his path. The shots he fired at Rodolphe Incorvala, once again through an open window, were eventually lethal; he later died in a hospital. Borel crossed the street to shoot and kill shopkeeper Mario Pagani, who was out buying a newspaper, with shots in the abdomen and head, as well as Mohammed Maarad in front of the "Café du Commerce". Marius Boudon and André Touret were killed while they were drawing money from an ATM, and Andrée Coletta while she was taking her poodle for a walk. Finally he shot Pascal Mostacchi to death at Place Peyssoneau.

By 8:00 a.m., police arrived at the scene. Realizing that he was surrounded, Borel fatally shot himself in the head under a cypress tree in front of a school. Observers of the rampage stated he had been poised and calm all the while, taking great care at aiming and shooting, hitting most of his victims in the head and returning when he did not hit properly the first time. In total, Borel had fired about forty shots.

On 23 October 1995, Jeanne Laugiero, 68, died in hospital from injuries sustained in the shooting, raising the death toll to fourteen victims. The last death in the killing spree was 68-year-old Pierre Marigliano, who succumbed to his wounds on 2 March 1996, bringing the death toll to fifteen. Borel's shooting spree was the deadliest act of mass murder in France since Christian Dornier killed fourteen people in Luxiol on 12 July 1989.

Victims 

Among the wounded were Jean Otto and Jean Boursereau.

References 

1978 births
1995 suicides
Familicides
French mass murderers
Murder–suicides in France
Suicides by firearm in France
People from Pau, Pyrénées-Atlantiques
People from Var (department)
French spree killers
1995 mass shootings in Europe